Pompidou or Le Pompidou may refer to:

 Georges Pompidou (1911–1974), former French Prime Minister and President
 Alain Pompidou (born 1942), foster son of Georges Pompidou and President of the European Patent Office, 2004–2007
 Centre Pompidou, a building named after Georges Pompidou
 Le Pompidou, a commune in Lozère, France
 Pompidou (TV series), a BBC comedy series

See also
 Pompadour (disambiguation)
 Pumpido, a surname